Beaver Towers: The Witch's Revenge is a children's fantasy novel by British author Nigel Hinton which was first published in 1981. It is the second installment in the Beaver Towers series, coming between Beaver Towers and Beaver Towers: The Dangerous Journey. It follows the story of Philip who was summoned to Beaver Towers when Oyin the Witch went after him.

Concept
The author decided to write a sequel to Beaver Towers after receiving letters about it and decided to have Philip in danger from Oyin back in his normal everyday life.

References

1981 British novels
1981 children's books
British children's books
British children's novels
British fantasy novels
Children's fantasy novels
Children's novels about animals
Talking animals in fiction
Witchcraft in written fiction
Beaver Towers Series